Ficus sur, with the common names Cape fig and broom cluster fig, is a widespread Afrotropical species of cauliflorous fig.

Distribution
The tree is found from Cape Verde and Senegambia across tropical West Africa to Cameroon and the Central African Republic; eastwards to Eritrea, northern Somalia and Yemen; and southwards through all tropical eastern and southern African countries. It is not found in Lesotho or the dry interior regions of Botswana, Namibia, or South Africa.

It is found in tropical forests and grassy woodlands, and occurs in higher densities within well-watered, temperate upland habitats. It is absent or outnumbered at lower, warmer climates by the similarly cauliflorous species, Ficus sycomorus.

Over its extensive range it is variable with respect to leaf shape, texture of the leaves and figs, deciduousness and overall size.

Description

Ficus sur is a fast-growing, deciduous or evergreen tree. Large specimens develop a massive spreading crown, fluted trunks, and buttress roots.

The large, alternate and spirally arranged leaves are ovate to elliptic with irregularly serrated margins. Fresh foliage is a conspicuous red colour and the papery, 1 cm long stipules are soon dropped. The bark of younger trees is smooth and pale greyish-white in colour, in contrast to the flaky, yellow bark of F. sycomorus. With increasing age the bark becomes darker and rough.

The figs are carried on short or long drooping spurs (or fascicles) which may emerge from surface roots, the trunk or especially from lower main branches. The figs are 2–4 cm in diameter and acquire a rosy, speckled exterior when ripe.

The fig seeds are dispersed after passing through the intestinal tracts of birds, bats, and primates.

Species associations
 
Lepidopteran larvae of the African map butterfly, fig tree moth, accented hawk moth, specious tiger, common fig-tree blue and lesser fig-tree blue feed on the leaves or roots of this species.

Pollination is performed by three species of Ceratosolen wasp. The Ceratosolen wasps are parasitised by Apocrypta guineensis and Sycoscapter niger wasps during their larval development inside the flower galls. As of 2006, 19 species of fig wasp were known to associate with the Cape fig, these belonging to genera Acophila, Apocrypta, Apocryptophagus, Ceratosolen, Eukoebelea, Idarnes, Sycomacophila, Sycophaga, Sycophila, Sycoscapter and Watshamiella. The Afrotropical fig wasp fauna is however poorly known.

Uses
The figs are edible and utilized in fresh or dried form by native people in many regions. They are also suited to preparation of fig preserve, if other suitable fruit are added.

The heavily clustered figs suggest fecundity, and some trees in East Africa have been venerated as sacred shrines in animist practices.

The wood is light and soft, and is not much used commercially.

Traditional medicinal plant
All parts may exude a latex, which has some traditional medicinal plant uses. The latex has been shown to contain ursene and oleanane triterpenoids, of which the latter may be effective in cancer treatment, while a methanolic extract from the roots is potentially effective against chloroquine-resistant malaria.

Gallery

References

Notes

External links

sur
Trees of Africa
Afrotropical realm flora
Flora of Yemen
Plants described in 1775
Plants used in traditional African medicine
Garden plants of Africa
Ornamental trees